Ajalli  (pronounced as Ụjalị by the natives), is an Igbo speaking town in south eastern Nigeria. It is the headquarters of Orumba North local government area of Anambra State. Its geographic coordinates are 6" 02' 46 North,  7" 12' 36 East.

References 

Populated places in Anambra State